Chekkulam is a small place in Kozhencherry, Pathanamthitta District, Kerala State, India.

Geography
Chekkulam is situated about 2.5 km from Kozhencherry.  At the Chekkulam junction, there are multiple and one public library.

Community life
There is a library calls 'The National Library & Reading Room'. In associate with this library there is a National Arts and Sports club in

Religion
The two major religions of Chekkulam are Christianity and Hinduism.  The largest sect of Christianity are the Marthomites.  A small church is the branch of the main Church, St.Thomas Mar Thoma Church, Kozhencherry.  About 50 families constitute the congregation.

References 

Villages in Pathanamthitta district